Hardwicke Bay is a locality in the Australian state of  South Australia located on the west coast of Yorke Peninsula overlooking the bay also named Hardwicke Bay about  west of the Adelaide city centre and about  north of the town of Warooka.

The boundaries of the locality were created on 27 May 1999 for the “long established name” and including the two shack sites known respectively as the “original shack site” and the “Moorowie Shack Site.”

Hardwicke Bay is located within the federal Division of Grey, the state electoral district of Narungga and the local government area of the Yorke Peninsula Council.

The majority land use within the locality is “primary production.”

The  reported Hardwicke Bay as having a population of 126 people.

See also
List of cities and towns in South Australia
Hardwick (disambiguation)

References

External links
Hardwicke Bay Progress Association official website

Towns in South Australia
Yorke Peninsula
Spencer Gulf